The French Congo or Middle Congo was a French colony which at one time comprised the present-day area of the Republic of the Congo and parts of Gabon, and the Central African Republic. In 1910, it was made part of the larger French Equatorial Africa.

The modern Republic of the Congo is considered French Congo's successor state, having virtually identical borders, and having inherited rights to sovereignty and independence from France through the dissolution of French Equatorial Africa in the late 1950s.

History

The French Congo began at Brazzaville on 10 September 1880 as a protectorate over the Bateke people along the north bank of the Congo River. The treaty was signed between King Iloo I and Pierre Savorgnan de Brazza; Iloo I died the same year it was signed, but the terms of the treaty were upheld by his queen Ngalifourou. It was formally established as the French Congo on 30 November 1882, and was confirmed at the Berlin Conference of 1884–85. Its borders with Cabinda, Cameroons, and the Congo Free State were established by treaties over the next decade.  The plan to develop the colony was to grant massive concessions to some thirty French companies. These were granted huge swaths of land on the promise they would be developed. This development was limited and amounted mostly to the extraction of ivory, rubber, and timber. These operations often involved great brutality and the near-enslavement of the locals.

Even with these measures most of the companies lost money. Only about ten earned profits. Many of the companies' vast holdings existed only on paper with virtually no presence on the ground in Africa.

The French Congo was sometimes known as Gabon-Congo. It formally added Gabon on in 1891, was officially renamed Middle Congo in 1903, was temporarily divorced from Gabon in 1906, and was then reunited as French Equatorial Africa in 1910 in an attempt to emulate the relative success of French West Africa.

In 1911 the Morocco-Congo Treaty gave part of the territory to Germany for an outlet on the Congo River.  This land, known as Neukamerun, was officially regained by France after the First World War.

A 1906 study , was published in conjunction with the French Colonial Exposition in Marseille. In 1925 African-American historian, sociologist, and Pan-Africanist W. E. B. Du Bois wrote "'Batouala' voices it. In the depths of the French Congo one finds the same exploitation of black folk as in the Belgian Congo or British West Africa."

List of governors

Chief administrators
12 Mar 1889 - 27 Apr 1895  Fortuné Charles de Chavannes       (s.a.)
 27 Apr 1895 - 22 Jan 1899  Louis Henri Albert Dolisie         (b. 1856 - d. 1899)
  1 May 1899 - 11 Jul 1902  Jean-Baptiste Philema Lemaire      (b. 1856 - d. 1932)
11 Jul 1902 -  5 Apr 1906  Émile Gentil                       (b. 1866 - d. 1914)
 5 Apr 1906 - 12 Mar 1909  Adolphe Louis Cureau               (b. 1864 - d. 1913)
17 Jan 1908 - 17 Nov 1908  Édouard Marie Bertrand Eugène  Dubosc-Taret (acting for Cureau)    (b. 1857 - d. 19..)
Lieutenant governors
12 Mar 1909 - 27 Jun 1910  Adolphe Louis Cureau               (s.a.)
27 Jun 1910 - 28 Jul 1911  Édouard Dubosc-Taret (acting)      (s.a.)
28 Jul 1911 - 16 Apr 1916  Lucien Louis Fourneau              (b. 1867 - d. 1930), acting to 17 Oct 1912)
16 Apr 1916 - 17 Jul 1917  Jules Gaston Henri Carde           (b. 1874 - d. 1949), (acting to 12 Oct 1916)
17 Jul 1917 -  2 Apr 1919  Jules Guy Le Prince (acting)       (b. 1868 - d. 19..)
2 Apr 1919 - 16 May 1919  Édmond Émilien Cadier              (b. 1868 - d. 1951)
16 May 1919 - 21 Aug 1919  Jean Henri Marchand (1st time, acting))     (b. 1864 - d. 19..)
21 Aug 1919 - 16 Aug 1922  Mattéo Mathieu Maurice Alfassa     (b. 1876 - d. 1942)
16 Aug 1922 - 20 Apr 1923  Georges Thomann (acting)           (b. 1872 - d. 1943)
24 Apr 1923 - 21 Jul 1925  Jean Henri Marchand (acting, 2nd time)     (s.a.)
 21 Jul 1925 -  1 Dec 1929  Administration by AEF Governor-general
1 Dec 1929 -  4 Dec 1930  Marcel Alix Jean Marchessou (acting)       (b. 1879 - d. 1964)
 4 Dec 1930 - May 1931     Pierre Simon Antonin Bonnefont (acting)    (b. 1877 - d. 1950)
May 1931 - 1932            Max de Masson de Saint-Félix       (b. 1882 - d. 1958)
1932 - 21 Nov 1932         Émile Buhot-Launay (acting)        (b. 1881 - d. 1970)
21 Nov 1932 - 10 Feb 1941  Administration by AEF Governor-general
10 Feb 1941 - 20 Aug 1945  Gabriel Émile Fortune              (b. 1897 - d. 1971)
21 Feb 1942 - 19 Jul 1942  Jean Charles André Capagorry   (acting for Fortune)     (b. 1894 - d. 1981)
20 Aug 1945 - 30 Apr 1946  Administration by AEF Governor-general
30 Apr 1946 - 16 May 1946  Christian Robert Roger Laigret (acting)    (b. 1903 - d. 1977)
 16 May 1946 -  6 Nov 1946  Administration by AEF Governor-general
 6 Nov 1946 - 31 Dec 1947  Numa François Henri Sadoul         (b. 1906 - d. 1990)
31 Dec 1947 -  1 Mar 1950  Jacques Georges Fourneau           (b. 1901 - d. 1956)
1 Mar 1950 - 25 Apr 1952  Paul Jules Marie Le Layec          (b. 1901 - d. 1965)
25 Apr 1952 - 15 Jul 1953  Jean Georges Chambon               (b. 1896 - d. 1965)
15 Jul 1953 -  2 Nov 1956  Ernest Eugène Rouys  (acting to 19 Feb 1954)              (b. 1901 - d. ....)
2 Nov 1956 - 29 Jan 1958  Jean-Michel Marie René Soupault    (b. 1918 - d. 1993)
29 Jan 1958 -  7 Jan 1959  Charles Paul Dériaud (acting)      (b. 1911 - d. 1964)
High Commissioner
 7 Jan 1959 - 15 Aug 1960  Guy Noël Georgy                    (b. 1918 - d. 2003)

See also
Raphaël Etifier
French Equatorial Africa
List of French possessions and colonies
French colonial empire
Belgian Congo
Ngalifourou

References

Further reading
 
 Petringa, Maria. Brazza, A Life for Africa. Bloomington, IN: AuthorHouse, 2006. .  Describes Pierre Savorgnan de Brazza's extensive explorations of what became French Congo, and later, French Equatorial Africa.

External links 
 

 
French Equatorial Africa
Former colonies in Africa
Congo
Congo
History of Central Africa
History of Gabon
Ubangi-Shari
History of the Republic of the Congo
States and territories established in 1882
States and territories disestablished in 1910
1882 establishments in French Congo
1882 establishments in Africa
1960 disestablishments in Africa
1882 establishments in the French colonial empire
1960 disestablishments in the French colonial empire
France–Republic of the Congo relations